This article summarizes the outcomes of matches including FIFA recognised, unofficial and matches played against club teams by the Bangladesh national under-23 football team

Legend

1990s

1991

2000s

2002

2004

2006

2007

2010s

2010

2011

2012

2014

2015

2016

2017

2018

2019

2020s

References

RSSSF DATABASE

Youth football in Bangladesh
under-23 results